Luís Silva (born March 30, 1980) is a Paralympian boccia player who won a silver medal at the 2012 Paralympic Games in Mixed Pairs BC3 with Armando Costa and José Macedo.

References

Living people
Paralympic boccia players of Portugal
Boccia players at the 2012 Summer Paralympics
1980 births